The 2021 BAL Playoffs were the inaugural playoffs of the Basketball Africa League (BAL) and were the concluding tournament of the 2021 BAL season. The playoffs began on 26 May 2021 and ended on 30 May 2021 with the Finals. The entire playoffs were played at Kigali Arena in Kigali, Rwanda.

Seeding
Teams were ranked and seeded based on their results in the group stage. Teams are ranked according to points, and if tied on points, the following tiebreaking criteria are applied, in the order given, to determine the rankings:
Head-to-head matches among tied teams;
Points difference;
Points scored;

Bracket

Quarterfinals

Semifinals

Third place game

Final

References

2021 Playoffs